Milorad (Cyrillic script: Милорад; Polish: Miłorad) is an old Serbian masculine given name derived from the Slavic elements: milo meaning "gracious, dear" and rad meaning "work, care, joy". The feminine form is Milorada. Nicknames: Milo, Miłosz, Radek, Radko, Rada.

The name may refer to:
 Milorad Arsenijević, Serbian football player and manager
 Milorad Bajović, Montenegrin footballer
 Milorad Bilbija, Bosnian Serb professional footballer
 Milorad Bojic, Serbian professor
 Milorad Bukvić, Serbian footballer
 Milorad Čavić, Serbian swimmer
 Milorad Dodik, Prime Minister of Republika Srpska
 Milorad Drašković, Minister of the Interior in the Former Kingdom of Yugoslavia
 Milorad Gajović, Montenegrin amateur boxer
 Milorad Karalić, Serbian handball player
 Milorad Korać, Serbian football goalkeeping manager and former player (goalkeeper)
 Milorad Kosanović, Serbian football manager and former footballer
 Milorad Malovrazić, football manager of FK Lovćen
 Milorad Mažić, Serbian football referee
 Milorad Milutinović, Serbian footballer player and manager
 Milorad Mišković, Serbian ballet dancer and choreographer
 Milorad Mitrović, born 1908, Serbian footballer 
 Milorad Mitrović, born 1949, Serbian football coach and player
 Milorad Nedeljković, Serbian economist and Axis-collaborating politician
 Milorad Nikolić, Serbian footballer 
 Milorad Pavić (writer),
 Milorad Pavić (footballer),
 Milorad Peković, Montenegrin footballer
 Milorad Popović, Serbian football defender who played for OFK Belgrad
 Milorad B. Protić, Serbian astronomer
 Milorad Rajović, Croatian footballer
 Milorad Ratković, Yugoslav/Bosnian Serb footballer
 Milorad Roganović, journalist and graduated sociology professor
 Milorad Simić, linguist
 Milorad Trbic, former Assistant Commander for Security of the Republika Srpska Army
 Milorad Zečević, Serbian footballer

See also

 Slavic names

External links
 http://www.behindthename.com/name/milorad

Slavic masculine given names
Croatian masculine given names
Macedonian masculine given names
Montenegrin masculine given names
Serbian masculine given names